Chief of Chukotka is a 1966 Soviet comedy film directed by Vitaly Melnikov.

Plot 
1922. Commissar Alexey  Mikhailovich Glazkov, who received a mandate from the Soviet government to manage the affairs of Chukotka, and the very young clerk Alyosha Bychkov accompanying him in a dog sled driven by a musher, travel from Ascension Bay to the village  Uigunan in Chukotka. On the way, Glazkov dies of typhus, and Alyosha and the musher bury him, covered with snow. However, despite the death of Glazkov, the musher refuses to turn the dogs in the opposite direction and delivers Alyosha to Uygunan, where he is met by the former tsarist customs officer Khramov. Having sent Alyosha to rest after his arrival, the cunning Khramov, having secretly examined the things brought by Alyosha, finds Glazkov's mandate among them and believes that Alyosha is Glazkov.

Cast 
 Mikhail Kononov as Bychkov
 Alexey Gribov as Timofey Ivanovich Khramov
 Gennadiy Danzanov as Wukwutagin
 Nikolay Volkov Sr. as Mr. Stenson
 Pavel Vinnik as foreigner in a hat
 Stepan Krylov as Chekmaryov
 Tito Romalio as waiter on the ship
 Iosif Konopatsky as Glazkov
 Aleksey Kozhevnikov as commissioner
 Konstantin Adashevsky as merchant Bryukhanov
 Pavel Pankov as Colonel Petukhov
 Anatoly Korolkevich as war minister
 Anatoli Abramov as order bearer
 Aleksandr Zakharov as foreign agent
 Aleksei Petrenko as robber (uncredited)

References

External links 
 

1966 films
1960s Russian-language films
Soviet comedy-drama films
1966 comedy-drama films
Films set in Siberia
Lenfilm films
Russian Civil War films
Soviet adventure comedy films
Soviet black-and-white films